Augusta Jane Chapin (July 16, 1836 – June 30, 1905) was an American Universalist minister, educator and activist for women's rights. She was born in Lakeville, New York, the eldest of eleven children, to Almon Morris Chapin and Jane Pease. She was one of only a few women's speakers at the Parliament of the World's Religions that took place at the Columbian Exposition in Chicago in 1893. She had a long preaching and teaching career around the Midwest, Pennsylvania, New York, Oregon, and California.

Education 
In 1852, at the age of 16, she began to attend the Olivet College. On December 7, 1864, in Lansing, Michigan, she became one of the first women to be ordained as a minister. In 1893 Chapin was conferred an honorary Doctor of Divinity degree by Lombard University; the first ever awarded to a woman in America. In 1893, she chaired the Woman's Committee of the Parliament of the World's Religions as part of the World's Columbian Exposition that took place in Chicago from May 1, 1893 – Oct 30, 1893.  She was a charter member of the American Woman Suffrage Association.

Career 
Chapin served many congregations during her ministerial career: itinerancy in Michigan, 1859–63; Bennington, Michigan, 1864–67; Mount Pleasant, Iowa, 1868; Milwaukee, Wisconsin, 1869; Iowa City, Iowa, 1870–73; Allston, Massachusetts, 1874; San Francisco, California and Oregon, 1874; Lansing, Michigan, 1875; Pittsburgh, Pennsylvania, 1875–76; Blue Island, Illinois, 1876–77; Chicago, Illinois, 1878; Aurora, Illinois, 1878–79; itinerancy in Michigan, 1880–83; Hillsdale, Michigan, 1884–85; Oak Park, Illinois, 1886–92; Omaha, Nebraska, 1894–95; and Mount Vernon, New York, 1897–1901.

References

Dictionary of Unitarian and Universalist Biography
 Cassara, Ernest. "Chapin, Augusta Jane" Notable American Women.  Vol. 1, 4th ed., The Belknap Press of Harvard University Press, 1975

External links
Papers, 1856-1914. Schlesinger Library, Radcliffe Institute, Harvard University.
 Michigan Women's Hall of Fame

1836 births
1905 deaths
Clergy of the Universalist Church of America
20th-century Christian universalists
19th-century Christian universalists
American Christian clergy
People from Livonia, New York
Olivet College alumni
Lombard College alumni
19th-century American clergy